The 1972 Roanoke International was a men's tennis tournament played on indoor carpet courts at the Roanoke Civic Center in Roanoke, Virginia, in the United States that was part of the 1972 USLTA Indoor Circuit. It was the inaugural edition of the event and was held from January 21 through January 23, 1972. First-seeded Jimmy Connors won the singles title and earned $2,500 first-prize money.

Finals

Singles
 Jimmy Connors defeated  Vladimír Zedník 6–4, 7–6
 It was Connors' 2nd singles title of the year and of his career.

Doubles
 Jimmy Connors /  Haroon Rahim defeated  Ian Crookenden /  Vladimír Zedník 6–4, 3–6, 6–3

References

External links
 ITF tournament edition details

Roanoke International
Roanoke International
Roanoke International